The JAPW Tag Team Championship is a championship in the Jersey All Pro Wrestling promotion. It became official title on December 5, 1997 when The Blood Angels (Diablos Macabre and Lucifer Grimm) defeated Don Montoya and Homicide in a tournament final to crown the first champion. There have been 42 reigns by 33 teams and 53 wrestlers with three vacancies.

Title history

Combined reigns

By team

By wrestler

See also
Jersey All Pro Wrestling

References

External links
Solie.org JAPW Tag Team Championship history
JAPW Tag Team Championship history
 JAPW Tag Team Championship

Tag
Tag team wrestling championships
Sports in Hudson County, New Jersey